Verso Books (formerly New Left Books) is a left-wing publishing house based in London and New York City, founded in 1970 by the staff of New Left Review and includes Tariq Ali and Perry Anderson on its board of directors.

History
In 1970, Verso Books began as a paperback imprint. It established itself as a publisher of nonfiction works on international politics. Verso Books has also periodically published fiction over its history. The publisher gained early recognition for translations of books by European thinkers and Continental philosophy, especially those from the Frankfurt School, and its affiliation with Marxist and neo-Marxist writers. Verso Books' best-selling title is the autobiography of Rigoberta Menchú, who was awarded the Nobel Peace Prize in 1992.

On April 8, 2014 Verso began bundling DRM-free e-books with print purchases made through its website. Verso's managing director, Jacob Stevens, stated that he expected the new offer on the Verso website to contribute £200,000 to the publisher's revenue in its first year helping to "shake up how publishers relate to their readership, and help to support independent publishing".

In 2019, Verso Books launched its fiction imprint, Verso Fiction. The fiction editor, Cian McCourt, said, "We want to publish bold, intelligent writing that’s politically astute, but not dogmatic or charmless."

By 2020, Verso Books had published over 1,800 titles. 

Verso Books titles are distributed in the United States by Random House. The publishing house is known to host many events in the United States and Europe, focusing on radical politics and history.

Verso has published books by Tariq Ali, Benedict Anderson, Robin Blackburn, Judith Butler, Noam Chomsky, Mike Davis, Norman Finkelstein, Fredric Jameson, Edward Said, Max Shachtman, Rebecca Solnit, Paul Feyerabend, Ellen Meiksins Wood, and Slavoj Žižek. Updated translations of Jean Baudrillard, Régis Debray, Jürgen Habermas, Rigoberta Menchú, and Paul Virilio have also been published through Verso.

Rebranding
Verso Books was originally known as New Left Books. The name "Verso" refers to the technical term for the left-hand page in a book (see recto and verso), and is a play on words regarding its political outlook and is also reminiscent of the expression "vice versa," or "the other way around".

Controversy

In 2021, Verso was publicly accused of poorly handling an internal sexual harassment grievance from management, a few years after the #MeToo movement impacted arts and cultural institutions. The board of directors responded with a public apology and updates on their sexual harassment policy and unionization efforts. However, they likewise maintain that their procedures were properly followed, as determined by an independent review.

See also 
 List of Radical Thinkers releases
 New Left Review

References

External links
 

Book publishing companies of the United Kingdom
Book publishing companies based in New York (state)
Political book publishing companies
Publishing companies established in 1970
1970 establishments in New York (state)
1970 establishments in England
American companies established in 1970
Verso Books books